Les yeux plus gros que le monde (literally The Eyes Greater than the World) is a 2014 album by the French-Guinean artist Black M. It was released on 31 March 2014 containing 19 tracks almost all of which appeared on SNEP based on downloads. The album sold 400,000 copies and was certified 3× platinum.

Owing to the great success of the album, the album was rereleased as a Deluxe Edition on 17 November 2014 with an additional CD of 8 tracks. To differentiate, the re-edition was titled Le Monde plus gros que mes yeux (meaning the World Greater than my Eyes).

In 2015, Black M released a live concert titled Les yeux plus gros que l'Olympia as an album registration and as DVD in which he interpreted almost all the tracks from Les yeux plus gros que le monde and follow-up Le monde plus gros que mes yeux with main invitees the Shin Sekaï, Sexion d'Assaut and with collaborations with Doomams, Abou de Being, Dry and Dr Berize.

Genesis
In 2013, Gims released his album Subliminal which was a public success. Previously the two members of the group Sexion d'Assaut, toured the album L'Apogée (2012). During the tour, Black M writes the lyrics for album.

Promotion
For the promotion of the album, Black M unveils as Maître Gims, a web series called Les pieds plus gros que ... where there are titles that are not in the album:

 Episode I: Les yeux plus gros que Beriz
 Episode II: Les yeux plus gros que le rap français
 Episode III: Les yeux plus gros que l'an 2014
 Episode IV: Les yeux plus gros que Youssoupha
 Episode V: Les yeux plus gros que Marseille ft. Alonzo

Cover
The cover is a tribute to that of the Dangerous (1991) album by Michael Jackson. However, a good number of elements are changed for questions of rights.

Track listing

Les yeux plus gros que le monde

Le monde plus gros que mes yeux (Reissue)

Les yeux plus gros que l'Olympia (live)

"Solitaire" (intro) (1:39)
"Spectateur" (4:15)
"Mme Pavoshko" (4:20)
"On s'fait du mal" (3:29)
"Pour oublier" (4:37)
Medley – "Qataris", "À la vôtre", "Jemaa El-Fna" (5:03)
"Foutue mélodie" (4:10)
"Ma musique" (3:15)
"Le regard des gens" (4:37)
"Jessica" (2:19)
– Deuxième fois (The Shin Sekaï) (4:20)
"Je ne dirai rien" (Black M feat. The Shin Sekaï) (3:43)
Medley – "Disque d'or", "Qui t'a dit", "Balader", "Désolé" (Sexion d'Assaut) (5:13)
"La légende black" (Black M feat. Dr Berize) (8:54)
"C'est tout moi" (3:54)
"Le garde le sourire" (3:55)
"Sur ma route" (7:46)

Les yeux plus gros que l'Olympia (DVD / live)
"Solitaire" (intro)
"Spectateur"
"Mme Pavoshko"
"On s'fait du mal"
"Pour oublier"
Medley – "Qataris", "À la vôtre", "Jemaa El-Fna"
"Foutue mélodie"
"Ma musique"
"Le regard des gens"
"Jessica"
"Rêver" (The Shin Sekaï) 
"Je reviendrai" (The Shin Sekaï)
"2ème fois" (The Shin Sekaï)
"Je ne dirai rien" (Black M feat. Shin Sekai and Doomams)
"Billet facile" (The Shin Sekaï, Abou de Being, Dry)
Medley - "Disque d'or", "Qui t'a dit", "Balader", "Désolé"  (Sexion d'Assaut)
La légende black (Black M feat. Dr Berize)
"C'est tout moi"
"Je garde le sourire"
"Sur ma route"

Charts

Weekly charts
Les yeux plus gros que le monde

Le monde plus gros que l'Olympia (live)

Year-end charts
Les yeux plus gros que le monde

Videography
"Mme Pavoshko" 
"Spectateur" 
"Sur ma route" 
"A force d'être" 
"La légende Black" 
"Je ne dirai rien" 
"Je garde le sourire" 
"On s'fait du mal"

References

2014 albums
Black M albums
French-language albums